Zannuba Ariffah Chafsoh, or more popularly known as Yenny Wahid (born 29 October 1974) is an Indonesian Islamic activist, journalist, and politician. She is currently the director of The Wahid Institute, an Islamic research center founded by her father, Abdurrahman Wahid.

Background
She is the second daughter of the late President of Indonesia Abdurrahman Wahid, a granddaughter of Indonesia's first religion minister Wahid Hasyim, and a great-granddaughter of Hasyim Asy'ari, founder of the world's largest Muslim organization Nahdatul Ulama. She obtained her bachelor's degree in design and visual communication from Trisakti University in Jakarta, but upon graduation she went to work as a journalist for Fairfax Media, publisher of Australian newspapers The Sydney Morning Herald and The Age. As a journalist, she covered news stories from East Timor and Aceh. For her stories in post-referendum East Timor, she and her team won a Walkley Award for journalism.

When her father was elected as the country's fourth President, she had to leave her career in journalism in order to assist her father in his new post, with special responsibility for communication. Upon Wahid's impeachment, she went to pursue a master's degree in Harvard's Kennedy School of Government as Mason Fellow. In 2004, upon her return from Boston, she was appointed as the director of the newly founded Wahid Institute, as political communication advisor to the President Susilo Bambang Yudhoyono from 2005 to 2007, a position that she still retains now. She was involved in the National Awakening Party (PKB) as secretary-general.

Greg Barton in The Australian credits her with having played a crucial role in persuading her father of "the extent of military-backed militia violence in East Timor [...] and the culpability of the Indonesian military leadership".
According to the Wahid Institute, the World Economic Forum named her a Young Global Leader in 2009, a role in which she remained active as of 2013.
She is married to Dhohir Farisi.

References

External links
Interview with Yenny Zannuba Wahid, 2 November 2007 - part of The Leaders project by the Sasakawa Peace Foundation (SPF) and AsiaViews
Struggle for the Soul of Islam: Inside Indonesia - documentary in the America at a Crossroads series produced by Public Broadcasting Station WETA, Washington, DC
Wahid's right-hand woman, 26 June 2001 - transcript of Australian Broadcasting Corporation TV interview

1974 births
Indonesian Muslims
Indonesian politicians of Chinese descent
Indonesian people of Arab descent
Javanese people
Living people
People from Jombang Regency
Daughters of national leaders
National Awakening Party politicians
Harvard Kennedy School alumni
Yenny
Indonesian Muslim activists
Indonesian women activists
Indonesian women journalists
Trisakti University alumni
Indonesian women academics
Fairfax Media
Mason Fellows